Natale Conti or Latin Natalis Comes, also Natalis de Comitibus and French Noël le Comte (1520–1582) was an Italian mythographer, poet, humanist and historian. His major work Mythologiae, ten books written in Latin, was first published in Venice in 1567 and became a standard source for classical mythology in later Renaissance Europe. It was reprinted in numerous editions; after 1583, these were appended with a treatise on the Muses by Geoffroi Linocier. By the end of the 17th century, his name was virtually synonymous with mythology: a French dictionary in defining the term mythologie noted that it was the subject written about by Natalis Comes.

Conti believed that the ancient poets had meant for their presentations of myths to be read as allegory, and accordingly constructed intricate genealogical associations within which he found layers of meaning. Since Conti was convinced that the lost philosophy of Classical Antiquity could be recovered through understanding these allegories, "The most apocryphical and outlandish versions of classical and pseudo-classical tales," notes Ernst Gombrich, "are here displayed and commented upon as the ultimate esoteric wisdom."

Taking a Euhemeristic approach, Conti thought that the characters in myth were idealized human beings, and that the stories contained philosophical insights syncretized through the ages and veiled so that only "initiates" would grasp their true meaning. His interpretations were often shared by other Renaissance writers, notably by Francis Bacon in his long-overlooked De Sapientia Veterum, 1609. In some cases, his interpretation might seem commonplace even in modern mythology: for Conti, the centaur represents "man's dual nature," both animal passions and higher intellectual faculties. Odysseus, for instance, becomes an Everyman whose wanderings represent a universal life cycle:

Despite or because of its eccentricities, the Mythologiae inspired the use of myth in various art forms. A second edition, printed in Venice in 1568 and dedicated to Charles IX, like the first edition, was popular in France, where it served as a source for the Ballet comique de la Reine (1581), part of wedding festivities at court. The Ballet was a musical drama with dancing set in an elaborate recreation of the island of Circe. The surviving text associated with the performance presents four allegorical expositions, based explicitly on Comes' work: physical or natural, moral, temporal, and logical or interpretive.

The allegorization of myth was criticized during the Romantic era; Benedetto Croce said that medieval and Renaissance literature and art presented only the "impoverished shell of myth." The 16th-century mythological manuals of Conti and others came to be regarded as pedantic and lacking aesthetic or intellectual coherence.

Nor were criticisms of Conti confined to later times: Joseph Scaliger, twenty years his junior, called him "an utterly useless man" and advised Setho Calvisio not to use him as a source.

Conti, whose family (according to his own statement) originated in Rome, was born in Milan. He described himself as "Venetian" because his working life was spent in Venice.

Notes

Further reading
Natale Conti's Mythologiae, translated and annotated by John Mulryan and Steven Brown, vol. 1-2 (Tempe: Arizona Center for Medieval and Renaissance Studies (ACMRS), 2006) (Medieval and Renaissance Texts and Studies, 316).
Natale Conti, Mitología, translation with notes and introduction by Rosa María Iglesias Montiel and Maria Consuelo Álvarez Morán (Universidad de Murcia, 1988). In Spanish. Navigate table of contents to download chapters.
 Maria Consuelo Álvarez Morán and Rosa María Iglesias Montiel, "Algunas lecturas de textos latinos en la Mythologia de Natalis Comes," Cuadernos de Filología Clásica 20 (1986) 31-39, full text downloadable.
 Maria Consuelo Álvarez Morán and Rosa María Iglesias Montiel, "Natale Conti, estudioso y transmisor de textos clásicos" in Los humanistas españoles y el humanismo europeo (Murcia, 1990), pp. 33–47.
 Maria Consuelo Álvarez Morán, Rosa María Iglesias Montiel, "Isacius en la Mythologia de Natalis Comes", Euphrosyne 31 (2003) 395-402.
 Virgilio Costa, "I frammenti di Filocoro tràditi da Boccaccio e Natale Conti", in E. Lanzillotta (ed.), Ricerche di Antichità e Tradizione Classica (Edizioni TORED, Tivoli [Roma], 2004), pp. 117–147.
 Virgilio Costa, "Natale Conti e la divulgazione della mitologia classica in Europa tra Cinquecento e Seicento", in E. Lanzillotta (ed.), Ricerche di Antichità e Tradizione Classica (Edizioni TORED, Tivoli [Roma], 2004), pp. 257–311.
 Virgilio Costa, "«Quum mendaciis fallere soleat». Ancora sui frammenti della storiografia greca tràditi da Natale Conti", in C. Braidotti - E. Dettori - E. Lanzillotta (eds.), οὐ πᾶν ἐφήμερον. Scritti in memoria di Roberto Pretagostini, vol. II (Università di Roma Tor Vergata, 2009), pp. 915–925.
 Rosa María Iglesias Montiel and Consuelo Álvarez Morán, "Los manuales mitológicos del Renacimiento", Auster 3 (1998). 83-99.
 Robert Thake, "A largely unexplored account of the Great Siege", Treasures of Malta, Vol XVIII No.1, (Christmas, 2011).

External links

Images from a 1616 edition

1520 births
1582 deaths
Italian male writers
Mythographers
Italian Renaissance humanists
16th-century Italian writers